Kibatalia stenopetala is a species of plant in the family Apocynaceae. It is endemic to the Philippines.

References

Flora of the Philippines
stenopetala
Endangered plants
Taxonomy articles created by Polbot
Taxa named by Elmer Drew Merrill